Varian may refer to:

People 
 Varian Fry (1907–1967), American journalist who helped thousands escape from Nazi-occupied Europe during World War II
 Varian Lonamei (born 1962),  Minister for Aviation, Communication and Meteorology, and member of the National Parliament of the Solomon Islands 
 Hal Varian (born 1947), Google's chief economist
 Isaac L. Varian (1793–1864), American politician and mayor of New York
 John Osborne Varian (1863–1931), Theosophist affiliated with the Temple of the People and the utopian community of Halcyon, California
 Roger Varian (born 1979), British racehorse trainer
 Russell Varian (1898–1959), co-founder of Varian Associates, son of John Osborne Varian
 Sigurd Varian (1901–1961), co-founder of Varian Associates, son of John Osborne Varian
 Sheila Varian (1937–2016), breeder of Arabian horses, niece of Russell and Sigurd Varian

Fictional Characters 

 Varian Wrynn, a character in the Warcraft series and Heroes of the Storm
 Varian, a character in Rapunzel's Tangled Adventure
 Prince Varian, a character in A Court of Thorns and Roses

Companies 
 Varian Associates, an electronics company which split up into three companies in 1999:
 Varian Medical Systems, a manufacturer of medical equipment
 Varian, Inc., a manufacturer of scientific instruments, now part of Agilent Technologies
 Varian Semiconductor, a supplier of equipment for semiconductor manufacturers, now part of Applied Materials
 Varian Data Machines, a division of Varian Associates which made minicomputers

Other 
 Varian, Iran, a village in Alborz Province, Iran
 USS Varian (DE-798), a U.S. Navy World War II destroyer escort
 Valentine–Varian House, a historic building in The Bronx, New York
 Varien, music producer